Steve Carroll is an American professional sports broadcaster from Saint Louis, who is currently serving as the radio play-by-play announcer for the National Hockey League's Anaheim Ducks. Other hockey teams that Carroll has announced for include the Des Moines Buccaneers, Nashville Knights, New Haven Nighthawks, New Orleans Brass, and Philadelphia Flyers. He began his career in 1976 as the play-by-play man for the Mineral Area Junior College men's basketball team in Flat River, Missouri.

Not being limited to hockey, Carroll has broadcast for a number of minor league baseball teams, including the Huntsville Stars, Iowa Cubs, Nashville Sounds, and New Orleans Zephyrs. He was also the voice of the United Soccer Leagues' New Orleans Storm and Vanderbilt University basketball.

References

"Steve Carroll." NHL: Anaheim Ducks. 11 July 2008.
"Steve Carroll's journey through the NHL." NHL: Anahheim Ducks. 2 November 2015.

1955 births
Living people
People from Missouri
American Hockey League broadcasters
American radio sports announcers
Anaheim Ducks announcers
Association football commentators
Minor League Baseball broadcasters
College basketball announcers in the United States
National Hockey League broadcasters
Philadelphia Flyers announcers